The 1928 Ole Miss Rebels football team represented the University of Mississippi during the 1928 Southern Conference football season. Gee Walker was on the team.

Schedule

Roster
T Thad Vann (C), Sr.

References

Ole Miss
Ole Miss Rebels football seasons
Ole Miss Rebels football